Cegłów  is a town in Mińsk County, Masovian Voivodeship, in east-central Poland. It is the seat of the gmina (administrative district) called Gmina Cegłów.

The town has a population of 2,109.

History
Cegłów was granted town rights in 1621 by Polish King Sigismund III Vasa.

In the early 20th century, a Mariavite parish was established in Cegłów, the second after Płock.

Following the joint German-Soviet invasion of Poland, which started World War II in September 1939, Cegłów was occupied by Germany. Local Polish railwaymen gave shelter to many Jews who escaped from transports to the Treblinka extermination camp. Polish railwaymen and Jewish escapees jointly carried out acts of sabotage on the Mińsk Mazowiecki-Mrozy railroad, attacking German trains. On June 28, 1943, the German gendarmerie, SS and Gestapo cracked down on the resistance and murdered 26 Poles, including women and children, and an unknown number of Jewish escapees.

Transport
There is a train station in Cegłów, and the Polish A2 motorway runs nearby, north of the town.

Gallery

References

Cities and towns in Masovian Voivodeship
Mińsk County
Masovian Voivodeship (1526–1795)
Nazi war crimes in Poland